1999–2000 Bosnia and Herzegovina Football Cup was the sixth season of Bosnia and Herzegovina's annual football cup. The Cup was won by Željezničar who were first in the final group.

Overview 
In the final stage of the competition, four clubs from the Football Federation of Bosnia and Herzegovina and the two clubs from the Football Federation of Herzeg-Bosnia joined the competition. After a preliminary round, the remaining three advanced to the final group with only forward matches at the end of which the first-placed in the group won the trophy and qualified for the 2000–01 UEFA Cup (qualifying round).

Bosniak Cup

Round of 32 
The matches were played on 27 November 1999.

|}

Round of 16 
The matches were played on 4 December 1999.

|}

Quarterfinals 
The first legs were played on 26 February and the second legs were played on 22 March 2000.

|}

Preliminary round 
The first legs were played on 22 May and the second legs were played on 26 May 2000.

|}

Final group

See also
 1999–2000 First League of Bosnia and Herzegovina

External links
Statistics on RSSSF
SportSport.ba forum

Bosnia and Herzegovina Football Cup seasons
Cup
Bosnia